Carla Del Poggio (2 December 1925 – 14 October 2010) was an Italian cinema, theatre, and television actress.

Biography
Born Maria Luisa Attanasio in Naples, she was the wife of Italian director Alberto Lattuada for 60 years, from 2 April 1945 until his death 3 July 2005. She died on 14 October 2010, aged 84, from undisclosed causes.

Filmography 

 Maddalena, Zero for Conduct, by Vittorio De Sica (1940)
 The Man on the Street, by Roberto Roberti (1941)
 La scuola dei timidi, by Carlo Ludovico Bragaglia (1941)
 A Garibaldian in the Convent, by Vittorio De Sica (1942)
 C'è sempre un ma!, by Luigi Zampa (1942)
 Violette nei capelli, by Carlo Ludovico Bragaglia (1942)
 Incontri di notte, by Nunzio Malasomma (1943)
 Signorinette, by Luigi Zampa (nel ruolo di Renata) (1943)
 Tre ragazze cercano marito, by Duilio Coletti (1943)
 L'angelo e il diavolo, by Mario Camerini (1946)
 Umanità, by Jack Salvatori (1946)
 Il bandito, by Alberto Lattuada (1946)
 Caccia tragica, by Giuseppe De Santis (1947)
 Gioventù perduta, by Pietro Germi (1947)
 Senza pietà, by Alberto Lattuada (1948)
 Il mulino del Po, by Alberto Lattuada (1949)
 Cavalcade of Heroes, by Mario Costa (1950)
 Luci del varietà, by Alberto Lattuada and Federico Fellini (1950)
 Red Seal, by Flavio Calzavara (1950)
 Il sentiero dell'odio, by Sergio Grieco (1951)
 La ragazza di Trieste (Les Loups chassent la nuit), by Bernard Borderie (1951)
 The Ungrateful Heart, by Guido Brignone (1951)
 Wolves Hunt at Night (1952)
 Tormento del passato, by Mario Bonnard (1952)
 Roma 11 o'clock, by Giuseppe De Santis (1952)
 Immortal Melodies, by Giacomo Gentilomo (1952)
 Storms, by Guido Brignone (1953)
 Cose da pazzi, by Georg Wilhelm Pabst (1953)
 L'eroe della Vandea (Les Révoltés de Lomanach), by Richard Pottier (1954)
 The Secret of Helene Marimon by Henri Calef (1954)
 The Wanderers, by Hugo Fregonese (1956)

References

External links

 

1925 births
2010 deaths
Italian film actresses
Italian television actresses
Italian stage actresses
Centro Sperimentale di Cinematografia alumni
Actresses from Naples
20th-century Italian actresses